John William DiMaggio (born September 4, 1968) is an American actor. His various voice roles include Bender on Futurama, Jake the Dog on Adventure Time, Marcus Fenix in the Gears of War series, Dr. Drakken on Kim Possible, Hak Foo in Jackie Chan Adventures, The Scotsman on Samurai Jack, Brother Blood on Teen Titans, Shnitzel on Chowder, Fu Dog on American Dragon: Jake Long, Hammerhead and Sandman on The Spectacular Spider-Man, Aquaman on Batman: The Brave and the Bold, King Zøg on Disenchantment, Wakka and Kimahri in Final Fantasy X, Rath in the Ben 10 franchise, Crosshairs, Leadfoot and Stratosphere in the Transformers film franchise, and Gonza in the English version of Princess Mononoke.

Early life
Born and raised in North Plainfield, New Jersey, DiMaggio graduated from North Plainfield High School. He is of Italian parentage, and was raised in the Catholic faith. He attended Rutgers University. One of his schoolmates was political strategist Steve Schmidt.

Career
DiMaggio is known for his roles as Bender on Futurama, Marcus Fenix in the Gears of War franchise, Dr. Drakken on Kim Possible, Jake the Dog on Adventure Time, Wakka and Kimahri in Final Fantasy X, and Niblet on Pound Puppies. He is a former comedian, appearing on stage as part of a comic duo named "Red Johnny and the Round Guy" and has several on-screen credits, such as Steve Ballmer in Pirates of Silicon Valley (the docudrama about the history of Apple Computer and Microsoft) and as Dr. Sean Underhill, a recurring character on Chicago Hope.

In 2013, he was the executive producer and narrator of I Know That Voice, a documentary on voice acting, along with producer Tommy Reid and director Lawrence Shapiro.

In 2022, upon news that Futurama would be revived for a second time through Disney and Hulu, DiMaggio ran into conflict during negotiations while demanding more money to reprise the role of Bender, which he dubbed "#BenderGate". Fans supported DiMaggio's hold out for better pay, while DiMaggio stated that he felt the entire cast deserved better pay and that it reflected a corporate attempt to take advantage of voice actors. The effort also received support from DiMaggio's colleagues, including veteran voice actors Tara Strong, Kari Wahlgren, and Mark Hamill, while James Adomian noted that a casting call for a sound-alike of DiMaggio had been sent out by the studio. While it was initially reported that DiMaggio would not be returning to the role, he later announced his decision to return. He revealed that though he did not succeed in negotiating a pay increase, he felt the attention to the issue of proper compensation in the voice acting industry was worthwhile.

Personal life
DiMaggio lives in Los Angeles and New York City. He has been married to actress Kate Miller since 2014.

Filmography

Television

Film

Feature films

Direct-to-video and television films

Video games

Live-action

Awards and nominations

References

Citations

Book references

External links

 
 
 HoboTrashcan – One on One with John DiMaggio – interview with audio highlights
 Interview on PMPNetwork (RealAudio audio file)

1968 births
Living people
American male film actors
American male television actors
American male video game actors
American male voice actors
American people of Italian descent
Animal impersonators
Annie Award winners
Cartoon Network people
Comedians from New Jersey
Male actors from New Jersey
North Plainfield High School alumni
People from North Plainfield, New Jersey
Rutgers University alumni
20th-century American male actors
21st-century American male actors